Frederick Parkhurst Dodd (11 March 1861 - 27 July 1937) was an Australian entomologist. He was known as the Butterfly Man of Kuranda.

Born in Victoria, Dodd worked in a bank in Townsville, Queensland for ten years before taking up entomology full-time. A number of species are named after him and his collection of insects was of importance. He undertook collecting expeditions in New Guinea as well as Australia.

The Taeniopterygidae genus Doddsia is named for him.

Dodd's son Alan, and daughters Elizabeth and Katharine, continued the entomological tradition.

Further reading 
 Monteith, Geoff, The Butterfly Man of Kuranda, Frederick Parkhurst Dodd. Brisbane: Queensland Museum, 1992.
 Musgrave, A., Bibliography of Australian Entomology, 1775-1930. Sydney: Royal Zoological Society of New South Wales, 1932.

External links 

 Dodd, Frederick Parkhurst (1861 - ), biography at the University of Melbourne's Bright Sparcs project.
 Queensland Museum The Butterfly Man of Kuranda Exhibitions

Australian scientists
Australian entomologists
1861 births
1937 deaths